Veinticuatro de Mayo Canton is a canton of Ecuador, located in the Manabí Province.  Its capital is the city of Sucre.  Its population at the 2001 census was 28,294.

Demographics
Ethnic groups as of the Ecuadorian census of 2010:
Montubio  54.4%
Mestizo  40.7%
Afro-Ecuadorian  3.2%
White  1.6%
Indigenous  0.1%
Other  0.1%

References

Cantons of Manabí Province